The men's 110 metres hurdles competition at the 1998 Asian Games in Bangkok, Thailand was held on 18–19 December at the Thammasat Stadium.

Schedule
All times are Indochina Time (UTC+07:00)

Results
Legend
DNF — Did not finish

Heats
 Qualification: First 3 in each heat (Q) and the next 2 fastest (q) advance to the final.

Heat 1 
 Wind: −1.3 m/s

Heat 2 
 Wind: −0.3 m/s

Final 
 Wind: −0.1 m/s

References

External links
Results

Men's 00110 metres
1998